Lovers in Bloom is a 2017 South Korean television series starring Im Soo-hyang, Do Ji-han, Lee Chang-wook, Lee Eun-hyung, and Nam Bo-ra. The series aired daily on KBS1 from 8:25 p.m. to 9:00 p.m. (KST) from May 29 to November 10, 2017.

Cast

Main
 Im Soo-hyang as Moo Goong-hwa
 Do Ji-han as Cha Tae-jin
 Lee Chang-wook as Jin Do-hyun
 Lee Eun-hyung as Moo Soo-hyuk
 Nam Bo-ra as Jin Bo-ra

Supporting

People around Goong-hwa
 Yoon Bok-in as Lee Sun-ok
 Kim Dan-woo as Bong Woo-ri
 Yang Seung-pil as Son Joo-young

People around Tae-jin
 Seo Woo-rim as Noh Yeon-shil
 Jeon In-taek as Cha Sang-chul
 Lee Eung-kyung as Oh Kyung-ah / Oh Choon-rae
 Lee Ja-young as Cha Hee-jin
 Kim Hyun-kyun as Kang Baek-ho
 Jung Yoon-seok as Kang Hae-chan

People around Do-hyun
 Ko In-bum as Jin Dae-gab
 Park Hae-mi as Heo Sung-hee
 Kim Jae-seung as Seo Jae-hee

Police officers
 Son Kwang-eop as Lee Gyo-suk
 Park Gyu-ri as Jang Eun-joo
 Ban Sang-yoon as Park Yong-soo
 Geum Ho-suk as Choi Kyung-pyo

Others
 Lee Joon-seo as Park Hyun-soo
 Jung Yoon-min as Park Hyun-soo's father
 Jo Ah-ra as Eun Seo-hyun

Special appearances
 Geummi as Choi Seung-ah (Episode 1, 3, 4, 17, 23-31)  (cameo)
 Kim Sung-soo as Stranger (cameo)
 Ahn Woo-yeon as Bong Yoon-jae (cameo)

Ratings 
In this table,  represent the lowest ratings and  represent the highest ratings.

Awards and nominations

References

External links
  
 

Korean Broadcasting System television dramas
2017 South Korean television series debuts
Korean-language television shows
South Korean melodrama television series
2017 South Korean television series endings